The Binder EB29 is a German single-seat, open-class self-launching powered sailplane designed and built by Binder Motorenbau. Its wings are based on those of the earlier EB28, while the fuselage is newly designed.

Variants
Originally available with wing extensions to give a 28.3 and 29.3 m span. Since March 2011, shorter 25.3 m wings have also been available.

Specifications (29m variant)

References

2000s German sailplanes
EB29
Motor gliders
Aircraft first flown in 2009